José María Campagnoli is an Argentine prosecutor. He worked in the political scandal of The Route of the K-Money. He was suspended from his functions in December 2013, having been found guilty of ″abuse of authority″ and ″malfeasance″ in his acting on such case. In July 2014 he was restored as prosecutor, while the trial against him continued.

References

Argentine people of Italian descent
Argentine prosecutors
People from Buenos Aires
Living people
Year of birth missing (living people)